Hemicyclops may refer to two different groups of organisms:
 Hemicyclops Meijere, 1913, a synonym for Hecamede (fly), a genus of flies
 Hemicyclops Claus, 1893, a genus of copepods in the family Clausidiidae